Bloodrock Live is a live double album by Bloodrock released on Capitol Records in May 1972.

While the album was marketed as being a live performance, three of the album's songs ("You Gotta Roll", "Cheater" and "Kool-Aid Kids") were actually studio recordings with dubbed applause.

Track listing

Credits
 Bloodrock	Primary Artist
 Rick Cobb	 Composer, Drums, Percussion
 Ed Grundy	 Bass, Composer, Vocals
 Kenneth Hamann	Engineer
 Stephen Hill	Composer, Keyboards, Vocals
 John Hoernle	Art Direction
 Andy Kent	Photography
 John Nitzinger	Composer
 Lee Pickens	 Composer, Guitar, Vocals
 Neal Preston	Photography
 Jim Rutledge	Composer, Remixing, Vocals
 Nick Taylor	 Composer, Guitar, Vocals

References 
 Utopia2000.org (mirror)

Bloodrock albums
1972 live albums
Capitol Records live albums